Clio is a legal technology company headquartered in Burnaby, British Columbia. Clio offers law firms cloud-based software that handles various law practice management tasks including client intake, contact management, calendaring, document management, timekeeping, billing, and trust accounting.

History 

Clio was established in 2007 by Jack Newton and Rian Gauvreau, who felt that the software commonly in use by law firms at the time was too expensive and difficult to use. When the company launched their software in 2008, it was the first cloud-based practice management software developed for law firms.

In 2012, Clio's Series B raised $6 Million. At the time, this investment was the second-largest ever made in a British Columbia-based internet company.  The company also made the first version of their Application Programming Interface available in 2012.

In September 2013, Clio released a mobile application that provides access to the company's software from iOS devices. The release occurred at the company's first annual Cloud Conference, an event that has gained prominence in the legal technology industry. 

In 2014, Clio received a further $20 Million in Series C funding from Bessemer Venture Partners, participated by its initial investor, German-based venture capital firm Acton Capital Partners.  Clio also announced the Android version of their mobile application, and a major product update.

In October 2016, Clio published the first Legal Trends Report, an annual publication that references aggregated metrics from the company's user base to analyze trends and benchmarks in law firm operations.  

On October 5, 2018, Clio announced that it had acquired client intake software provider Lexicata, and that the Lexicata product would be converted into a new product, called Clio Grow. By this time, Clio also supported 120 integrations with other legal software applications. 

One year later, in September 2019, Clio raised a $250M (USD) Series D from TCV, JMI Equity.

On April 27, 2021, after several acquisitions in the legal technology space, Clio was valued at $1.6B with announcement of $110M Series E funding round.

See also
Legal technology
Law practice management software

References

Legal software
Cloud computing providers
Companies based in Burnaby
Software companies established in 2008
Software companies of Canada
Canadian companies established in 2008